Deng Longguang was a KMT general from Guangdong.

Career
 1923 - Commanding Officer 11th Regiment, 6th Brigade, 3rd Division, Guangdong Army
 1927 - General Officer Commanding 1st Instructional Division, 4th Army
 1930 - General Officer Commanding 12th Division, 4th Army
 1930 - Chief of Staff, 12th Division, 4th Army
 1931 - Deputy General Officer Commanding 1st Instructional Division, 1st Army Group
 1936 - General Officer Commanding 156th Division
 1937 - General Officer Commanding 83rd Army
 1938 - Deputy Commander in Chief 29th Army Corps
 1938 - 1941 - General Officer Commanding 64th Army
 1939 - Deputy Commander in Chief 35th Army Group
 1939 - 1945 - Commander in Chief 35th Army Group
 1945 - Deputy Commander in Chief 2nd Area Army
 1946 - Deputy Director, Guangzhou Field Headquarters
 1948 - Deputy Director, Guangzhou pacification Office
 1949 - Advisor, Presidential Strategy Commission, Taiwan
 1950 - Member, Planning Commission for the Recovery of the Mainland

National Revolutionary Army generals from Guangdong